The men's lightweight boxing competition at the 2012 Olympic Games in London was held from 30 July to 12 August at the ExCeL Exhibition Centre.

This competition consisted of 28 boxers from 28 nations competed.

Competition format
Like all Olympic boxing events, the competition was a straight single-elimination tournament. This competition consisted of 28 boxers who had qualified for the competition through various qualifying tournaments held in 2011 and 2012. The competition began with a preliminary round on 29 July, where the number of competitors was reduced to 16, and concluded with a final on 12 August. As there were less than 32 boxers in the competition a number of boxers received a bye for the preliminary round. Both semi-final losers were awarded bronze medals, so no boxers competed again after their first loss.

All bouts consist of three three-minute periods where the boxers receive points for every successful punch they land on their opponent's head or upper body. The boxer with the most points at the end of the bouts wins. If a boxer is knocked to the ground and cannot get up before the referee counts to 10 then the bout is over and the opponent wins.

Schedule 
All times are British Summer Time (UTC+1)

Results

Finals

Top half

Bottom half

References

Boxing at the 2012 Summer Olympics
Men's events at the 2012 Summer Olympics